Bent Creek, North Carolina may refer to:

Bent Creek, Buncombe County, North Carolina
Bent Creek, Yancey County, North Carolina